Pramod Singh is an Indian politician from Deoria district who won a legislative election in 2007 in the Gauri Bazar constituency of Deoria district, Uttar Pradesh. He defeated Minister Shakir Ali by a margin of nearly 15,000 votes. In April 2009, Singh disrupted an election in Sopari Bazar village, accusing supporters of opposition parties of fraudulent voting.

During the Mayawati administration, he became an important politician of eastern Uttar Pradesh. He joined BJP in 2015. Death :- 3 November 2021

References

External links
http://electionanalytics.in/uttarpradesh/gauri-bazar-results/2007
http://myneta.info/up2007/candidate.php?candidate_id=797
http://www.travelindia-guide.com/assembly-elections/uttar-pradesh/deoria-constituencies/gauri-bazar.aspx

Living people
Bharatiya Janata Party politicians from Uttar Pradesh
Uttar Pradesh MLAs 2017–2022
People from Deoria, Uttar Pradesh
Bahujan Samaj Party politicians from Uttar Pradesh
Year of birth missing (living people)